Anisoscelini is a tribe of leaf-footed bugs in the family Coreidae. It was formerly spelled Anisoscelidini, but the tribal name spelling was incorrectly formed.

Description
Anisoscelini species are elongated with flattened tibia of the legs in the shape of a leaf. The antennae have the 2 and 3 segments flattened (Chondrocera sp.) or some species having the 2 and 3 segments terete, or cylindrical, slightly tapering at both ends, circular in cross section, and smooth-surfaced. The length of the first segment of the antennae is as long as the length of the anterior margin of the eye to the tarsus (Narnia sp.).

Distribution
The tribe consists of species found mostly in the Americas and especially neotropical environments; however, genera such as Leptoglossus may also be represented in Europe (mostly introductions) and eastern Asia.

Genera

The Coreoidea Species File includes:

 Anisoscelis Latreille, 1829 i c g b
 Baldus Stål, 1868 i c g
 Bellamynacoris Brailovsky, 1997 i c g
 Belonomus Uhler, 1869 i c g
 Chondrocera Laporte, 1832 i c g b
 Coribergia Casini, 1984 i c g
 Dalmatomammurius Brailovsky, 1982 i c g
 Diactor Perty, 1830 i c g
 Holhymenia Le Peletier and Serville, 1825 i c g
 Kalinckascelis Brailovsky, 1990 i c g
 Leptoglossus Guérin-Méneville, 1831 i c g b
 Leptopelios Brailovsky, 2001 i c g
 Leptoscelis Laporte, 1832 i c g
 Leptostellana Brailovsky, 1997 i c g
 Malvana Stål, 1865 i c g
 Malvanaioides Brailovsky, 1990 i c g
 Narnia Stål, 1862 i c g b
 Onoremia Brailovsky, 1995 i c g
 Petalopus Kirby, 1828
 Phthia Stål, 1862 i c g b
 Phthiacnemia Brailovsky, 2009 i c g
 Phthiadema Brailovsky, 2009 i c g
 Phthiarella Brailovsky, 2009 i c g
 Plunentis Stål, 1860 i c g
 Rhytidophthia Brailovsky, 2009 i c g
 Sephinioides Brailovsky, 1996 i c g
 Tarpeius Stål, 1868 i c g
 Ugnius Stål, 1860 i c g

Data sources: i = ITIS, c = Catalogue of Life, g = GBIF, b = Bugguide.net

Example species
Chondrocera laticornis

References

External links

Coreidae of Florida (Hemiptera, Heteroptera) 
 

 
Coreinae
Hemiptera tribes